The Pacific Crest is the highest portion of the Sierra Nevada and Cascade Range mountain ranges on the West Coast of the United States.

Pacific Crest may also refer to:
 Pacific Crest Trail, a long-distance hiking trail
 Pacific Crest Drum and Bugle Corps,  a competitive junior drum and bugle corps based in Diamond Bar, California
 Pacific Crest Community School, a private alternative school in Portland, Oregon
 Pacific Crest Bicycle Trail, a road-based bicycle touring route that parallels the Pacific Crest Trail 
 American Music Program Pacific Crest Jazz Orchestra, a jazz band and magnet school program in Portland, Oregon